Laz is a South Caucasian language. It is sometimes considered as a southern dialect of Zan languages, the northern dialect being the Mingrelian language.

Today, the area where Laz is spoken stretches from the village Sarpi of Khelvachauri district in Georgia to the village Kemer of Rize province in Turkey. Laz is spoken also in Western Turkey in the villages created by Laz muhajirs in 1877–1878. In Georgia, out of Sarpi, the Laz language islets were also in Abkhazia, but the fate of them is obscure at present.

Laz is divided into three dialects: Khopa-Chkhala, Vitze-Arkabe and Atina-Artasheni. Dialectical classification is mainly conditioned by phonetic characteristics. More specifically, the crucial point is the reflexes of the Kartvelian phoneme , which is maintained only in the Khopa-Chkhala dialect but has different reflections in Vitze-Arkabe and Atina-Artasheni dialects (see below).

Phonology and writing system

Vowels

Laz vowel inventory consists of five sounds: a, e, i, o, u.

Consonants

The consonant inventory of Laz varies among the dialects. A full set of sounds is present in the Khopa-Chkhala dialect, while the Vitze-Arkabe and Atina-Artasheni dialects lost glottalized uvular q.

Phonological processes

Uvular q sound change

Glottalized uvular q is preserved only in the Khopa-Chkhala dialect before the vowels and the consonants v and l. This sound is also evidenced after glottalized stops and affricates in several words, such as p̌qorop (I love smb./sth.); ǩqorop (I love you); t̆qubi (twins), ǯqv-/ǯqvin- (to reconcile); ç̌qint̆i (fresh-soft and unripe). But in the most of cases *t̆q → t̆ǩ; *ǯq → ǯǩ; *ç̌q → ç̌ǩ.

In the Vitze-Arkabe dialect, in the neighborhood of consonants *q → ǩ (exception is the verb ovapu ← *oqvapu "to be"). In the word-initial prevocalic and in the intervocalic positions *q → ∅.

In Atina-Artasheni dialect:
in word-initial prevocalic position q → ∅. E.g. *qoropa → oropa "love", *qona → ona "cornfield" etc.
 in intervocalic position *q → y/∅. E.g. *loqa → *loʔa → loya/loa "sweet", *luqu → *luʔu → luu "cabbage" etc.
word-initial qv → ǩv/v. E.g. qvali → ǩvali/vali "cheese, *qvaci → ǩvaci/vaci "testicle" etc.
intervocalic qv → y. E.g.  *oqvapu → oyapu "to be/become", *iqven → iyen "s/he will be/become" etc.
in all other cases q → ∅Regressive assimilation

The most common types are:
 regressive voicing:
 s → z t → d k → g ş → j ç → c p → b regressive devoicing:
 b → p g → k regressive glottalization
 b → p̌ p → p̌ g → ǩDissimilative deletion of consonant

In some morphological contexts featuring two consonants n split only with a vowel, the former can be deleted. miqonun → miqoun (I have {an animate object}), iqvasinon → iqvasion (s/he will be), mulunan → *muluan → mulvan (they are coming).

Another dissimilation, presumably sporadic, occurs in deǩiǩe → deiǩe (minute); note also that the Arabic source of this word دقيقة daqīqa contains a uvular , and as above uvulars are unstable in Laz.

Intervocalic reduction of r
This process is evidenced in the Khopa-Chkhala and Vitze-Arkabe dialects, where in intervocalic position facultatively r  → y  → ∅.

Palatalization of velars
In the Atina-Artasheni dialect, the velars followed by the front vowels e and i and the glide y transform to alveolar affricates:g → cǩ → ç̌k → ç Alphabet 

Laz is written in a Georgian script or in the Latin script (as used in Turkish, but with specific Laz extensions).

Grammatical cases

Laz has eight grammatical cases: nominative, ergative, dative, genitive, lative, ablative, instrumental and almost extinct adverbial.

Example of adjective declension

Example of noun declension

Nouns

As in other South Caucasian languages, Laz distinguishes two classes of nouns and classifies objects as:

 'Intelligent' entities. Respective interrogative is mi? (who?)
 'Non-intelligent' entities. Respective interrogative is mu? (what?)

 Noun classification scheme 

Numerals

The Laz numerals are near identical to their Megrelian equivalents with minor phonetic differences. The number system is vigesimal like in Georgian.

Cardinal numbers

Almost all basic Laz cardinal numbers stem from the Proto-Kartvelian language, except ar(t) (one) and eči (twenty), which are reconstructed only for the Karto-Zan chronological level, having regular phonetical reflexes in Zan (Megrelo-Laz) and Georgian. The numeral šilya (thousand) is a Pontic Greek loanword and is more commonly used than original Laz vitoši.

Laz cardinal numbers compared to Megrelian, Georgian and Svan

Ordinal numbers

Ordinal numbers in Laz are produced with the circumfix ma-...-a, which, in contrast with Megrelian, may be extended with suffix -n. The circumfix ma-...-a originates from Proto-Kartvelian and has regular phonetical equivalents in Georgian (me-...-e) and Svan (me-...-e)

Ordinal numbers' derivation rule

Laz ordinal numbers compared to Megrelian, Georgian and Svan

Fractional numbers

The fractional numbers' derivation rule in Laz and Megrelian is akin to Old Georgian and Svan.

Fractional numbers' derivation rule

Laz fractional numbers compared to Megrelian, Georgian and Svan

Pronouns

Personal pronouns

Possessive pronouns

Verbs
Laz verbs are inflected for seven categories: person, number, version, tense, mood, aspect and voice.

Person and Number

In Laz, like Megrelian, Georgian and Svan, verbs can be unipersonal, bipersonal and tripersonal

Monovalent verbs have only subjective person and are intransitive.
Bivalent verbs have one subject and one object (direct or indirect). They are:
transitive if the object is directintransitive if the object is indirectTrivalent verbs have one subject and two objects (one direct and the other indirect) and are ditransitive.

The person may be singular or plural.

Subject and object markers in Laz are the same as in Megrelian

Subject markers

Object markers

In pre-consonant position, the markers v- and g- change phonetically:

Before voiced consonants: v- → b-Before voiceless (nonglottalized) consonants:v- → b- → p-g- → k-Before glottalized consonants:v- → b- → p̌-g- → ǩ-Version

Like Megrelian, Georgian and Svan, Laz has four types of version marking:
subjective – shows that the action is intended for oneself,
objective – action is intended for another person,
objective-passive – the action is intended for another person and at the same time indicating the passiveness of subject,
neutral – neutral with respect to intention.

Laz version markers compared to Megrelian, Georgian and Svan

Tenses

The maximum number of screeves in Laz is 22. They are grouped in three series. Two screeves (future I and past of future I) exist only for the verb r-, which serves as a 1st series root for oqopumu/ovapu/oyapu (to be).

Paradigm of verb conjugation

stems: ç̌ar- (to write) and r- (to be: just for future I and past of future I)

According to oldness these screeves can be grouped in two sets:
old (primary) (common with Megrelian).
new (secondary) derived from the basic screeves (specific Laz).

Classification of screeves according to oldness

Mood

Indicative
Indicative statement claims that the proposition should be taken as an apparent fact.

Interrogative
There are two ways to transform an indicative statement into a question:
by means of interrogative words. E.g. mi? (who?), mu? (what?), so? (where?), mundes? (when?), muç̌o? (how?) etc. This rule is valid for Megrelian, Georgian and Svan as well.
by adding an interrogative particle -i to the end of a verb. It has the same function as Megrelian -o, Old Georgian -a and Svan -ma/-mo/-mu.

Imperative
Indicates a command or request. The aorist form is used when addressing 2nd person (singular/plural) and aoristic optative in all other cases.

Subjunctive
Expresses possibility, wish, desire.

Conditional
Indicates condition in contrary to a fact. For this reason a verbal suffix -ǩo (At.-Arsh, Vtz.-Ark.) / -ǩon/-ǩoni'' (Khop.-Chkh.) is used.

Aspect

Voice

See also

Notes

References 

.

.

External links
 Laz Georgian-Latin and Latin-Georgian converter

Laz language
Kartvelian grammars